The Stockholm University of the Arts is a public university college created 1 January 2014 by merging the School of Dance and Circus, the University College of Opera, and the Stockholm Academy of Dramatic Arts. This is the result of the ministerial committee directive issued in 2012.
The three institutions remained autonomous with regards to undergraduate studies, but the amalgamation intended to achieve critical mass and high quality environments for research and doctoral studies. The university has not used the names of its three predecessor institutions since 1 January 2020.

Vice-chancellor is Paula Crabtree, and chairman of the board is Kåre Bremer, former vice-chancellor of Stockholm University.

References

External links
Stockholm University of the Arts

 
Arts in Sweden
Universities and colleges formed by merger in Sweden
University colleges in Sweden